Maxates is a genus of moths in the family Geometridae first described by Frederic Moore in 1887.

Description
Palpi porrect (extending forward), where the second joint thickly scaled and reaching beyond the frons. Third joint naked. Forewings with highly arched costa towards apex. The outer margin usually highly crenulate and excised between veins 4 and 6. Veins 3, 4 and 7 to 10 stalked. Vein 11 anastomosing (fusing) with vein 12. Hindwings quadrate, with margin highly crenulate (scalloped) and produced to a point at vein 6, and tail at vein 4. Veins 3, 4 and 6, 7 stalked.

Species
Maxates acutissima Walker
Maxates albistrigata (Warren, 1895)
Maxates angulata (Lucas, 1888)
Maxates calaina (Turner, 1910)
Maxates centrophylla (Meyrick, 1888)
Maxates coelataria (Walker, 1861)
Maxates cowani (Butler, 1880)
Maxates dissimulata (Walker, 1861)
Maxates dysides Prout, 1922
Maxates eumixis (Prout 1911)
Maxates fuscifimbria (Prout)
Maxates fuscipuncta (Warren, 1898)
Maxates glaucaria (Walker, 1866)
Maxates goniaria (Felder & Rogenhofer, 1875)
Maxates grandificaria Graeser, 1890
Maxates inaptaria (Walker)
Maxates iridescoides Holloway, 1996
Maxates iridescens (Warren)
Maxates korintjiensis (Prout, 1933)
Maxates lactipuncta (Inoue, 1989)
Maxates lugubriosa Holloway, 1996
Maxates marculenta (Prout, 1933)
Maxates magnipuncta (Prout, 1916)
Maxates melancholica (Prout, 1912)
Maxates melinau Holloway, 1996
Maxates multitincta (Lucas, 1891)
Maxates muluensis Holloway, 1996
Maxates obliterata Holloway, 1996
Maxates orthodesma (Lower, 1894)
Maxates prasina (Warren, 1894)
Maxates protrusa (Butler, 1878)
Maxates selenosema (Turner, 1941)
Maxates seria Holloway, 1996
Maxates sinuolata (Inoue, 1989)
Maxates subannulata (Prout)
Maxates submontana Holloway, 1996
Maxates tanygona (Turner, 1904)
Maxates thetydaria (Guenée, 1857)
Maxates tristis Holloway, 1996
Maxates variegata Holloway, 1996
Maxates veninotata (Warren, 1894)
Maxates waterstradti (Prout, 1933)

References

Hemitheini